Betchaïdelle Ngombele (born 23 March 2004) is a Congolese handball player for RK Krim and the Congolese national team.

She participated at the 2021 World Women's Handball Championship in Spain.

References

2004 births
Living people
Congolese female handball players